The 2004 Wyre Forest District Council election took place on 10 June 2004 to elect members of Wyre Forest District Council in Worcestershire, England. The whole council was up for election with boundary changes since the last election in 2003. The council stayed under no overall control, but with the Conservatives taking over as the largest party on the council from the Health Concern party.

Background
In total 113 candidates stood in the election with all 42 seats being contested for the first time since 1979 after boundary changes had taken place. The boundary changes meant that Bewdley ward had gained an extra councillor and become Bewdley and Arley, while Blakedown and Chaddesley had been combined into one ward. The Conservatives put up a full slate of 42 candidates with Health Concern having the next most with 27. Other candidates included 24 Labour, 9 Liberal, 7 Liberal Democrats and 3 independents. A noted feature of the candidates was that there were ten married couples standing in the election with two of them being existing councillors.

Before the election Health Concern had 16 seats on the council as compared to 11 for the Conservatives. This was a drop for Health Concern from 2003 after 3 councillors had defected to the Conservatives.

Election result
The results had the Conservatives gain 8 seats to become the largest party on the council. This was mainly at the expense of Health Concern whose losses included the leader of the council, Howard Martin. For other parties the election saw the Liberals gain one seat to hold 8, while both Labour and the Liberal Democrats stayed on the same number of seats. The results meant that 14 councillors, a third of the council, would be new. Voter turnout was up at 38.83% after seeing less than 31% in 2003, with the highest turnout being 54.36% in Wolverley.

The Conservatives success was put down to a strong campaign and they were expected to form the next administration. This would be the first time in 15 years that the Conservatives would have control of Wyre Forest council, with the other parties saying they would not attempt to form a rival coalition leaving the way clear for the Conservatives. The Conservatives were expected to attempt to implement their manifesto pledges including bringing a cinema to Kidderminster, changing car parking in Kidderminster and reviewing the fortnightly refuse collection.

Conservative control was confirmed at a council meeting on 30 June with Stephen Clee becoming leader of the council. Meanwhile, Health Concern councillors chose Ken Stokes to become the new leader of their group on the council.

Ward results

By-elections between 2004 and 2006
A by-election was held in Aggborough and Spennells after the death of Conservative councillor Maureen Aston. Candidates at the election included the former leader of the council Howard Martin for Health Concern, a former councillor for the ward, Adrian Sewell for Labour, and the first Green party candidate for an election to Wyre Forest District Council, Kate Spohrer. The seat was held by Conservative John Aston, husband of the former councillor, with a majority of 63 votes over Liberal Democrat Samantha Walker.

References

2004 English local elections
2004
2000s in Worcestershire